The First League of the Republika Srpska 2009–10 was the 15th since its establishment.

League table

External links 
 FSRS official website.

Bos
2009–10 in Bosnia and Herzegovina football
First League of the Republika Srpska seasons